General elections were held in Sark on 12 December 2018. The elections saw 15 candidates contest the nine available seats in the Chief Pleas, the first time seats were contested since 2012. Seven of the nine elected members were new to the legislature.

The election was conducted under plurality block voting.

Results

References

Sark
2018 in Guernsey
2018
Non-partisan elections
December 2018 events in Europe